

This is a list of the National Register of Historic Places listings in Bucks County, Pennsylvania.

This is intended to be a complete list of the properties and districts on National Register of Historic Places in Bucks County, Pennsylvania. The locations of National Register properties and districts for which the latitude and longitude coordinates are included below, may be seen in a map.

There are 163 properties and districts listed on the National Register in the county, including 12 National Historic Landmarks.  Another 3 sites were once listed on the Register but have since been removed.

Current listings

|}

Former listings

|}

References

 
Bucks County